
AD 3 (III) or 3 AD was a common year starting on Monday or Tuesday (link will display the full calendar) of the Julian calendar (the sources differ, see leap year error for further information) and a common year starting on Monday of the proleptic Julian calendar. In the Roman Empire, it was the Year of the Consulship of Lamia and Servilius (or, less frequently, year 756 Ab urbe condita). The denomination "AD 3" for this year has been used since the early medieval period when the Anno Domini calendar era became the prevalent method in Europe for naming years.

AD 3 was the only prime-numbered Year of the Pig.

Events

By place

Roman Empire 
 The rule of Emperor Augustus is renewed for a ten-year period.

China 
 Wang Mang foils a plot by his son, Wang Yu, his brother-in-law, Lu Kuan, and the Wei clan to oust him from the regent's position. Wang Yu and Lu Kuan are killed in the purge that follows.

Births 
 Ban Biao, Chinese historian and official (d. AD 54)
 Geng Yan, Chinese general of the Han Dynasty (d. AD 58)
 Tiberius Claudius Balbilus, Roman politician and astrologer (d. AD 79)

Deaths 
 Bao Xuan, Chinese politician of the Han Dynasty

See also 
Ab urbe condita

References 

 

als:0er#Johr 3